The CW Television Network (commonly referred to as just The CW) is an American English-language commercial broadcast television network that is controlled, through The CW Network, LLC, by Nexstar Media Group with a 75% ownership interest. The network's name is derived from the first letters of the names of its two founding co-owners CBS Corporation and Warner Bros. (the latter was owned by Time Warner, later AT&T's WarnerMedia). Nexstar closed its acquisition of a controlling interest in The CW on October 3, 2022, with Paramount Global and Warner Bros. Discovery (CBS Corporation and WarnerMedia's respective successors) each retaining a 12.5% ownership stake.

The CW debuted on September 18, 2006, as the successor to UPN and The WB – both of which respectively shut down on September 15 and 17 of that year. The CW's first two nights of programming – on September 18 and 19, 2006 – consisted of reruns and launch-related specials. The CW marked its formal launch date on September 20, 2006, with the two-hour premiere of the seventh cycle of America's Next Top Model. The network's programming lineup is intended to appeal mainly to viewers between the ages of 18 and 34, although from 2008 to 2011, the network shifted its programming to appeal to women in that demographic. As of August 2017, The CW's audience is 50% male and 50% female. 

The network runs programming seven days a week: airing nightly in prime time, along with a Saturday morning live-action educational programming block produced by Hearst Media Production Group called One Magnificent Morning.

The network is also available in southern Canada on pay television providers through stations owned-and-operated by Nexstar and on affiliates owned by Paramount and others that are located within proximity to the Canada–United States border (whose broadcasts of CW shows are subject to simultaneous substitution laws imposed by the Canadian Radio-television and Telecommunications Commission, if a Canadian network holds the broadcast rights); it is also available through two Nexstar-controlled stations that are classified in the United States as superstations – New York City-based de facto flagship WPIX and Los Angeles-based secondary flagship KTLA.

Additionally, The CW is available in northern Mexico through affiliates located near the Mexico–U.S. border (such as KFMB-DT2—San Diego/Tijuana, KECY-DT3 in El Centro, California, KVIA-DT2 in El Paso, and KCWT-CD with simulcast network KMBH-LD2 in McAllen/Brownsville, Texas) on pay television providers. In both Canada and Mexico, some free-to-air CW affiliate signals originating from the U.S. are receivable over-the-air in border areas depending on the station's signal coverage.

History

1993–2006: Predecessors and formation

UPN and The WB both launched within one week of each other in 1995, just as the Fox network had started to secure a foothold with American television audiences. The two networks launched to limited fanfare and generally mediocre to poor results. However, over the subsequent  seasons, both were able to air several series that became quite popular (such as Buffy the Vampire Slayer, Star Trek: Voyager, 7th Heaven, Dawson's Creek, Charmed, Smallville, and America’s Next Top Model). Towards the end of their first decade on the air, The WB and UPN were in decline, unable to reach the audience share or have the effect that Fox had gained within its first decade, much less than that of the Big Three networks (ABC, CBS and NBC). In the eleven years that UPN and The WB were in operation, the two networks lost a combined $2 billion. Chris-Craft Industries, Viacom, and Time Warner officials had discussed a possible merger of UPN and The WB as early as September 1995, only eight months after their respective launches; however, discussions ultimately broke down over issues on how to combine Chris-Craft and Tribune Broadcasting's station interests in the proposal to merge the networks, since the two companies' station portfolios overlapped with one another in several major markets. By 2003, however, Time Warner became mired in several debt problems. The company had already been responsible for shutting down Warner Bros.' in-house animation department and for selling off major portions of the conglomerate, such as the 2004 sale of Warner Bros. Records and the rest of Warner Music Group to an investor group led by Edgar Bronfman Jr. and Thomas H. Lee Partners.

Executives from CBS and Time Warner announced on January 24, 2006 that they would respectively shut down UPN and The WB, and combine resources to form a new broadcast network, to be known as The CW Television Network, that would – at the outset – feature programming from both of its predecessors-to-be as well as new content developed specifically for the new network. Warners and CBS expected to produce inexpensive shows for the network, which they could sell outside the US. CBS chairman Leslie Moonves explained that the name of the new network was formed from the first letters of CBS and Warner Bros, joking, "We couldn't call it the WC for obvious reasons." Although some executives reportedly disliked the new name, Moonves stated in March 2006 that there was "zero chance" the name would change, citing research claiming 48% of the target demographic were already aware of the CW name.

In May 2006, The CW announced that it would pick up a combined thirteen programs from its two predecessors to air as part of the network's inaugural fall schedule: seven series held over from The WB (7th Heaven, Beauty and the Geek, Gilmore Girls, One Tree Hill, Reba, Smallville and Supernatural) and six held over from UPN (America's Next Top Model, Veronica Mars, Everybody Hates Chris, Girlfriends, All of Us and WWE SmackDown!). Upon the network's launch, The CW chose to use the scheduling model utilized by The WB due in part to the fact that it had a more extensive base programming schedule than UPN, allowing for a larger total of weekly programming hours for the new network to fill. (The WB carried 30 hours of programming each week because it had a children's program block and a daytime lineup that UPN did not offer; UPN was primarily a prime time-only network with 10 weekly hours of network programming at the time of the network's shutdown.)

2006–2011: Launch and early struggles
Like both UPN and The WB, The CW targets its programming towards younger audiences. CBS and Time Warner hoped that combining their networks' schedules and affiliate lineups would strengthen The CW into a fifth "major" broadcast network. One week before the network's official launch, on September 11, 2006, a new, full version of the network website was launched; the website began to feature more in-depth information about The CW's shows.

The CW launched with a premiere special / launch party from the CBS Paramount-produced Entertainment Tonight at Warner Bros. Studios in Burbank, California on September 18, 2006, after a repeat of the tenth-season finale of 7th Heaven; the same schedule was repeated on September 19, with the sixth-season finale of Gilmore Girls. The network continued to air season finales from the previous season through the remainder of the first week, except for America's Next Top Model and WWE SmackDown!, which respectively began their new seasons on September 20 and 22, with two-hour premieres. When Top Model made its network premiere on September 20, 2006, The CW scored a 3.4 rating/5 share (with hourly ratings of 3.1/5 and 3.6/6; The CW placed fifth overall) in the Nielsen household ratings. It scored a 2.6 rating among adults 18–49, finishing fourth in that age demographic and beating the 2.2 rating earned by Fox on that night. The network's second week consisted of season and series premieres for all of its other series from September 25 to October 1, with the exception of Veronica Mars, which debuted its third season on October 3.

Despite having several of the most popular programs carried over from UPN and The WB as part of its schedule, The CW – even though it experienced some success with newer programs that launched in subsequent seasons which became modest hits – largely struggled to gain an audience foothold throughout its first five years on the air. Because of declining viewership for the network during the 2007–08 season and effects from the Writers Guild of America strike, the network announced on March 4, 2008, that it would eliminate its comedy department (dismissing executive vice president of comedy Kim Fleary and senior vice president of comedy Steve Veisel), while also combining its drama and current programming departments into a single scripted programming unit. The corporate restructuring resulted in the layoffs of approximately 25 to 30 employees. It also included the elimination of certain positions, other newly opened positions being left unfilled, layoffs from the Kids' WB unit (as the block was set to be replaced by The CW4Kids on May 24), and the elimination and transfer of marketing positions at The CW Plus to the network's marketing department.

On May 9, 2008, The CW announced that it would lease its Sunday lineup (then running from 5:00 to 10:00p.m. Eastern and Pacific Time) to production company Media Rights Capital (MRC). As Sundays have historically been a low-rated night for the network during its first two seasons on the air (due to stiff competition from CBS, ABC and Fox's strong Sunday lineups, and complicated further by NBC's acquisition of Sunday Night Football in September 2006, shortly before The CW debuted), the move allowed The CW to concentrate on its Monday through Friday prime time schedule, while giving MRC the right to develop and schedule programs of its own choosing and reap advertising revenue generated by the lineup. The Sunday series that were scheduled – two reality series (4Real and In Harm's Way) and two scripted series (romantic dramedy Valentine and drama Easy Money) – performed poorly in the ratings (averaging only 1.04 million viewers), prompting The CW to scrap its agreement with MRC and program Sunday nights on its own starting on November 30, 2008. With no first-run programming available to run on Sundays as a backup, the network added reruns of The Drew Carey Show and Jericho, and movies to replace the MRC-produced programs.

One of the shows carried over to the network from UPN, WWE SmackDown, ended its run on The CW after the September 26, 2008, episode due to negotiations ending between the WWE and The CW on renewing the program. Representatives for The CW later confirmed that it had chosen not to continue carrying SmackDown because the network had redefined its target audience as exclusively females 18 to 34 years old, whereas SmackDown targeted a predominantly male audience. Following SmackDowns move to MyNetworkTV that same season, the Fox-owned network (which launched the same month as The CW's debut, albeit two weeks earlier, on September 5, 2006) began beating The CW in the Friday ratings every week from that program's debut on the network, though The CW continued to beat MyNetworkTV overall.

The CW generally struggled in the Nielsen ratings from its inception, primarily placing fifth in all statistics tabulated by Nielsen (total audience viewership and demographic ratings). On several occasions, The CW was even outrated by the Spanish language network Univision. This led to speculation within the industry (including a May 16, 2008, article in The Wall Street Journal) that CBS, Time Warner or both companies might abandon the venture if ratings did not improve. However, The CW's fortunes were buoyed in the 2008–09 and 2009–10 television seasons thanks to increased ratings among females in the 18–34 demographic and the buzz that some of its newer series (such as Gossip Girl, 90210 and The Vampire Diaries) had generated with audiences. Executives with CBS Corporation and Time Warner also emphasized their commitment to the network.

On May 5, 2009, The CW announced that it would give the five hours of network time on Sundays back to its affiliated stations that fall, effectively becoming a weeknight-only network in prime time, in addition to The CW Daytime and The CW4Kids blocks (the latter block, airing on Saturday mornings, would remain the only weekend programming supplied by the network). This change meant the Sunday late afternoon repeat block that The CW inherited from The WB (formerly branded by that network as "EasyView") was discontinued. Subsequently, in mid-May, 65% of The CW's affiliates, including those carrying The CW Plus, signed agreements to continue to air the replacement MGM Showcase movie package on Sundays, which was offered as a traditional syndicated film package meant for The CW's former prime time slot on that night.

2011–2016: New leadership and content shift
On April 28, 2011, Mark Pedowitz was appointed by the network to succeed original president of entertainment Dawn Ostroff; Pedowitz was made the network's first president and assumed broader responsibilities in The CW's business operations than Ostroff had. As president of entertainment, Ostroff oversaw entertainment operations while John Maatta, the network's chief operating officer, handled business affairs; both reported to a board composed of CBS and Warner Bros. executives. Maatta began reporting to Pedowitz as a result of the latter's appointment as network president. Pedowitz revealed that the core target demographic of the network would not change, though The CW would attempt to lure new viewers. Pedowitz began looking to bring comedies back to The CW after Ostroff had publicly declared that the difficulty of developing comedies for its target demographic was the reason for their removal from the network following the 2008–09 season (with Everybody Hates Chris, and The Game – a spin-off of Girlfriends – becoming the last comedies to be cancelled). The network also ordered more episodes of its original series and ran them consecutively starting on September 12 through the first week of December without repeats. In July 2012, Pedowitz no longer referred to the target demographic of The CW as women 18–34, but rather that it would now be an "18–34 adult network".

Although the network was still not profitable, CBS and Warners were very successful in selling their CW shows overseas. In 2011, a $1 billion deal with streaming service Netflix became another way to sell CW shows. The introduction of action-superhero series Arrow, based on DC Comics' Green Arrow, received favorable reviews from critics and became a hit with audiences when it premiered. As evidence of the network's refocusing toward a broader audience, Arrow not only premiered to some of the highest viewership totals in the network's history (the third-highest overall , behind the series premieres of The Vampire Diaries and The Flash), but it also gave the network its strongest performance in the demographic of males 18–34 since Smallville ended its run in May 2011. The network also found success with its summer programming in 2013 with the revival of the U.S. version of the improv comedy series Whose Line Is It Anyway?, which later became a year-round staple on the network's schedule. Arrow continued to perform strongly, leading to a spin-off with The Flash, which surpassed The Vampire Diaries as the highest-rated premiere in the network's history and became the most-watched show on the network. Jane the Virgin earned some of the highest critical praise of any series during the 2014–15 television season, and became the first CW series ever to be nominated for, and win, a Golden Globe Award, with lead actress Gina Rodriguez winning the Golden Globe for "Best Actress in a Comedy or Variety Series". Other CW shows like The Flash, The 100, and Nikita would also go on to be nominated for Primetime Emmy Awards categories, and several shows from 2011 to 2019 being nominated for categories in the Teen Choice Awards, Saturn Awards, and others.

Overall, the network ended the 2014–15 season posting its highest average total viewership in a single television season since 2007–08 with 2.15 million viewers, a 12% increase in total viewership year-to-year; The CW also posted its highest seasonal demographic ratings among males ages 18–49 with a 0.8 share.

Expanding on the success of the network's Arrowverse franchise, DC's Legends of Tomorrow premiered to high ratings for the network and became the most-watched show on the network's Thursday night block in two years. The 2015–16 season also saw Crazy Ex-Girlfriend become one of the most critically acclaimed shows of the season and the second show on the network to be nominated for, and win, a Golden Globe Award, with actress Rachel Bloom winning a Golden Globe Award for "Best Actress in a Comedy or Variety Series".

2016–2019: Programming with studio properties
The network's Arrowverse expanded again with Supergirl being moved to the network from CBS for its second season. The debut of Archie Comics-based Riverdale signaled the network's foray into mining their parent studio's library of IP to create new television series based on recognizable properties. This led to another new DC Comics series, Black Lightning, and a rebooted Dynasty. While it met with poor ratings, Dynasty proved lucrative thanks to the Netflix output deal and international syndication which earned CBS Studios millions of dollars per episode.

Selling CW series like Dynasty to Netflix and overseas markets was so profitable for Warners and CBS that the network almost stopped cancelling shows, and expanded its broadcast schedule. On February 14, 2018, The CW announced that it would add a 2-hour primetime block on Sunday nights beginning in the fourth quarter of 2018, returning the network to Sundays for the first time since the lease to Media Rights Capital ended in 2009, as well as expanding The CW's primetime slate from 10 hours a week to 12. Discussions with CBS and Warner Bros. about the expansion began as early as July 2017; both gave their approval to the move that December, with the network reaching clearance deals with key affiliate partners in early 2018.

On June 12, 2018, AT&T received antitrust approval to acquire Warner Bros. parent Time Warner, with the acquisition closing two days later. Time Warner was renamed WarnerMedia and AT&T became a co-owner of The CW with CBS.

The CW debuted reboots of Charmed, Roswell, and Originals spin-off Legacies during the 2018–19 season. Despite modest ratings, their renewals – along with the renewal of the entire 2018–19 lineup (absent those series already previously announced as ending) – reflected their value to the network's founding co-owners CBS and Warner Bros., which received the windfall of selling them to Netflix and international buyers. This strategy continued with the 2019–20 season debuts of the new Arrowverse series Batwoman, Riverdale spin-off Katy Keene, and Nancy Drew.

On August 13, 2019, CBS and Viacom officially announced their intention to re-merge, with the combined company to be named ViacomCBS. The merger was completed on December 4, 2019, making them officially with AT&T's WarnerMedia co-owners of The CW.

2019–2022: Streaming era deals
Warners and CBS did not renew CW's Netflix deal in 2019, intending to use their shows on the network for their own streaming services. International sales also mostly ended, because both companies wanted to retain rights to their own shows to compete with Netflix outside the United States. WarnerMedia's HBO Max streaming service subsequently acquired exclusive streaming rights to Warner Bros.-produced CW shows. This began with the 2019–20 season, with the Warner Bros.-produced Batwoman and Katy Keene debuting on HBO Max after their current seasons finished airing on The CW. The CBS Studios-produced Nancy Drew was originally announced to be heading to corporate-sibling owned CBS All Access, but appeared on HBO Max instead. The reason for this was amid the rebranding of CBS All Access to Paramount+ and the changes surrounding the ViacomCBS merger, CBS and Warner Bros. made the collective decision to have all CW shows have a singular streaming home on HBO Max.

Beyond being the streaming home of CW programming, HBO Max shares a co-ownership connection with the network which allows for programming partnerships. This began with DC Comics series Stargirl, which The CW shared with DC Universe. DC Universe and The CW co-financed the series, with episodes premiering on DC Universe and airing the next day on The CW. After DC Universe was folded into HBO Max, Stargirl was renewed with a new co-finance deal in which The CW receives first-run airings followed by its launch on HBO Max. Going forward, The CW and HBO Max will continue to collaborate on potentially co-financing new projects, with the model of premiering first on HBO Max and a second run on The CW. "They creatively have to want the show too and believe that the show should go on their platform first for them to work," CW CEO Pedowitz said. "For us its a great model because it's a way to get excellent summer scripted programming and maximize programming across platforms."

On May 13, 2021, The CW announced that it would begin programming Saturday nights on a regular basis beginning in the 2021–22 television season, following approval of the expansion by the network's key affiliate groups. As part of the deal, The CW ceased programming The CW Daytime block and returned the time to its stations. With the addition of Saturday nights, The CW has programming on every night of the week for the first time in the network's history, becoming only the sixth American English-language commercial broadcast network ever and the first since Fox to have offered prime time content on a nightly basis.

2022–present: Acquisition by Nexstar
On January 5, 2022, The Wall Street Journal reported that WarnerMedia and ViacomCBS were exploring a possible sale of either a majority stake or all of The CW, and that Nexstar Media Group, which became The CW's largest affiliate group when it acquired former The WB co-owner Tribune Broadcasting in 2019, was considered a leading bidder. Network president and CEO Mark Pedowitz confirmed talks of a potential sale but added that it was "too early to speculate what might happen". Nexstar CEO Perry Sook in Spring 2022 did not confirm the rumored buyout but stated that he would not be surprised if Nexstar owned a broadcast network.

In May 2022, three months before Nexstar made their purchase official, The CW canceled a number of shows. Ten shows were axed in 2022, three times the average number per year that The CW had canceled over the previous decade, including one-season shows 4400 and Naomi, and longtime fixtures Batwoman, Charmed, Dynasty, In the Dark, Legends of Tomorrow, Roswell, New Mexico, and Legacies. More shows were cancelled or given final season orders in the following months.

In late June 2022, The Wall Street Journal indicated a purchase of The CW by Nexstar was close, and on August 15 Nexstar confirmed it had "entered into a definitive agreement" to acquire a 75% majority share in the network; the remaining 25% would be shared equally by Paramount Global (the former ViacomCBS) and Warner Bros. Discovery (the company formed by Discovery, Inc.'s acquisition of WarnerMedia from AT&T). Additionally, Nexstar stated that Mark Pedowitz would remain the chairman and CEO of The CW. Though no monetary terms were announced, Nexstar reportedly would not pay any cash or stock up front, and would absorb approximately $100 million of network debt. The Hollywood Reporter stated that Nexstar retained $54 million based on its cash on hand, accounts receivable, accounts payable and other liabilities. As the sale did not entail the transfer of any FCC broadcast licenses, Nexstar immediately took operational control of the network.

Nexstar, in a conference call that took place the day its purchase was announced, indicated a desire to run The CW cost-consciously. Citing research that indicated the network spends “almost twice” the amount other broadcast networks spend on programming, a partial reason for the May 2022 cancellations, Nexstar stated that it planned to seek shows with smaller production budgets and/or a reasonably-priced acquisition fee, including unscripted fare, syndicated content, and other content that can create profits through broadcast airings. Nexstar also stated that it aimed for The CW to turn a profit by 2025.

In the conference call, Nexstar indicated that it wanted to convert The CW into a network with broad appeal. It cited data indicating that the young audience which The CW focused upon preferred watching its shows through streaming platforms instead of during live broadcasts, while the average audience of a broadcast CW affiliate was approximately 58 years old. Nexstar indicated that it would focus on the older audiences as well and not just the younger demographic. In particular, Nexstar was reported to have been seeking older-skewing dramas, police procedurals, and sitcoms.

Paramount Global and Warner Bros. Discovery would still produce content for The CW as primary content suppliers, though Nexstar noted that the arrangement would be primarily for the 2022–23 broadcast season. It indicated that it "will have the option to extend the partnership" with Paramount and WBD beyond that season. Nexstar stated in September 2022 that it would seek to supplement The CW's content by acquiring projects from studios beyond solely Paramount and WBD. while any The CW content not licensed to other streaming services would continue to appear on its own streaming platform CW Seed.

On October 3, Nexstar officially announced that it had closed the deal to acquire the majority ownership of The CW. Longtime chairman and CEO Mark Pedowitz resigned from his role, with Dennis Miller taking over as the president of The CW. Rick Haskins, The CW's chief branding officer and president of the network's streaming division, as well as chief financial officer Mitch Nedick were let go on the same day. Thirty to forty employees were laid off on November 1, including several executives. Longtime executive Paul Hewitt was replaced with Beth Feldman as the senior vice president of the network's communications unit. On the following day, Brad Schwartz was appointed as the president for the entertainment division, overseeing programming strategy, creative and brand development, and day-to-day operations.

On November 8, Nexstar announced that the carryover programming from the former parent companies of The CW, Paramount and WBD, would be minimal by the 2023–24 season. In January 2023, the network announced its first-ever national sports broadcast contract with LIV Golf. On February 1, The CW appointed Heather Olander as the head of unscripted programming, a position under which she will report to Schwartz. In a shift away from scripted programming, it also let go of Executive VP for Current Programming Michael Roberts, and Executive VP for Development Gaye Hirsch, among other layoffs on the following day.

The CW appointed Chris Spadaccini as the chief marketing officer on February 6, and Tom Martin as the head of business affairs and general counsel on February 9.

Programming

Network programming and scheduling

The CW airs its prime time programming for only two hours every night, compared to the three hours on Monday through Saturdays and four hours on Sunday nights programmed by the three longest-established networks, ABC, CBS, and NBC. This "common prime" scheduling (which was originated by Fox when it launched its primetime schedule in April 1987, and later adopted by CW predecessors The WB and UPN when they launched in January 1995) allows the option for affiliates to air either a local newscast, syndicated programming or both during the 10:00–11:00 p.m. (Eastern and Pacific Time) time period. As with The WB and UPN, The CW formerly did not run network programming on Saturday nights – even though it maintains a syndicated children's program block on Saturday mornings – allowing affiliates to run syndicated programs, sports, movies or network programs that were preempted from earlier in the week because of special programming carried by the station, in the 8:00–10:00 p.m. (Eastern and Pacific) time period (MyNetworkTV also does not carry any weekend prime time programming, having turned network time on Saturday evenings over to its affiliates in March 2007).

The CW, unlike the "Big Four" broadcast networks, does not air any national newscasts or late-night programming, and did not program any network-supplied sports broadcasts until 2023.

Because of these factors, The CW's affiliates handle the responsibility of programming non-network time periods, with the majority of its stations filling those slots mainly with syndicated programming. However, some of the network's affiliates broadcast their own local news and/or sports programs (either produced by the station itself or through outsourcing agreements with an affiliate of another network).

The CW provides 17 hours of regularly scheduled network programming each week, over the course of seven days. The network provides fourteen hours of prime time programming to its owned-and-operated and affiliated stations nightly from 8:00 to 10:00 p.m. Eastern and Pacific Time (nearly as much programming as Fox which airs 15 hours of primetime programming). Outside of prime time, a three-hour educational programming block called "One Magnificent Morning" (which airs as part of the CW schedule through a time-lease agreement with Litton Entertainment) airs on Saturday mornings from 8:00 a.m. to 11:00 a.m. in all time zones.

The Litton-produced Saturday morning block (the latter of which is subject to scheduling variances similar to the weekday hour in some markets, such as in Atlanta and San Diego) are designed to be tape delayed and are therefore recommended to air in the same time slot in all time zones, though both are broadcast one hour earlier on affiliates of The CW Plus in the Central, Mountain and Alaska Time Zones. In Guam, CW Plus affiliate KTKB-LD in Hagåtña airs the CW schedule day and date on a one-day tape delay from its initial broadcast because of the time difference between Guam and the continental United States as the island is on the west side of the International Date Line. Supernatural (which originally aired on The WB) was the final CW series carried over from either of the network's respective predecessors that continued to be broadcast on the network, airing its final episode in November 2020.

The CW formerly aired short segments during commercial breaks within certain episodes of its programs known as "Content Wraps" – a play on the network's name – in order to advertise one company's product during part or the entirety of a commercial break, a concept since classified under the term of native advertising. The entertainment magazine series CW Now was inspired in part by the success of the Content Wraps as it was intended to be a series with product placement; the program was cancelled in 2008, after a single 23-episode season. For the 2006–07 season, The CW reached an agreement with American Eagle Outfitters to incorporate tie-ins with the company's aerie clothing line as part of the Content Wrap concept within the network's Tuesday night schedule, which included subjects in the commercials commenting on plot points in each of the shows. The agreement was cut down to regular advertising in February 2007, after a fan backlash by viewers of both shows and general criticism of the campaign.

On May 12, 2021, executives with The CW announced it would start offering prime-time programming seven days a week for the first time since the broadcast network launched in 2006. As part of the deal, The CW said it returned its 3:00 p.m. to 4:00 p.m. weekday programming block to its affiliates.

News programming

The CW does not produce any national news content, and most of its affiliates and owned-and-operated stations do not have their own autonomous news operations. The network has two O&Os and two affiliates that produce their own local news programming, which were all carry-overs from previous affiliations: O&Os WPIX in New York City and KTLA in Los Angeles started their news departments as independent stations and/or during early affiliations with other networks including DuMont; WCCB in Charlotte, North Carolina started its news operation as a Fox affiliate; and WISH-TV in Indianapolis has been airing local news since 1956. KTLA has the largest number of weekly hours devoted to local news programming of any CW affiliate with 89¾ hours of scheduled news each week.

Eight other CW-affiliated stations maintained in-house news operations, but have since disaffiliated from the network or discontinued in-house production:
 WGN-TV in Chicago has maintained a news department since it launched as a CBS affiliate in 1948; the station – which, along with sister stations KTLA and WPIX, transitioned into a news-intensive outlet during its tenures with The WB and The CW – retains a news-heavy format after disaffiliating from the network in September 2016;
 Under Tribune Broadcasting ownership, WLVI in Boston produced an in-house 10:00 p.m. newscast, which was replaced in December 2006 with one produced by then-NBC affiliate (now independent) WHDH, after Tribune sold WLVI to that station's longtime owner Sunbeam Television;
 XETV-TDT in Tijuana, Baja California, Mexico (serving the San Diego market) retained the news department it launched in 1999 as a Fox affiliate when it joined The CW in August 2008; XETV's news department shut down on March 31, 2017, following the earlier announcement that the CW affiliation in San Diego would move to a subchannel of CBS affiliate KFMB-TV.
 In April 2012, KCWI-TV in Des Moines, Iowa broadcast a morning news and talk program, which transitioned from an in-house production to a brand extension during Good Morning America of ABC affiliate WOI-DT's morning newscast on April 11, 2016, as a result of Nexstar Broadcasting's acquisition of KCWI.
 For several years, WDCW in Washington, D.C. used reporters from Tribune's local bureau and anchors based from the studios of CBS-affiliated station WTVR in Richmond, Virginia, while then Tribune-owned KDAF in Dallas, KIAH in Houston and WSFL-TV in Miami used non-traditional formats (in the form of a newsreel-style program known as NewsFix, along with the morning show Morning Dose; both KDAF and KIAH had previously produced more traditional newscasts, launched during their WB affiliations, earlier in their tenures with The CW). These programs were all canceled in September 2018, a result of budget cuts within Tribune, along with the termination of Tribune's attempted merger with Sinclair Broadcast Group. KIAH and KDAF have started producing their morning newscast since 2018: KIAH's entry is entitled Morning Dose, and KDAF began a partnership with Urban One to simulcast a portion of the morning radio show of KBFB. WDCW later began carrying the 10pm edition of DC News Now, a combined news operation with independent WDVM-TV, in 2022 (almost three years after Nexstar bought WDCW, but also divested WTVR to the E. W. Scripps Company, in 2019).

News programming on CW affiliates and O&Os – if the station carries any – is often outsourced to another major network affiliate in the market, especially if they are operated as part of a duopoly or management agreement, such as Nexstar Media Group's respective CW-Fox duopolies of KWGN-TV/KDVR in Denver and KPLR-TV/KTVI in St. Louis (the Fox stations in both duopolies – KDVR and KTVI – were formerly owned by Local TV, with Tribune-owned KWGN and KPLR respectively consolidating with those stations through local marketing agreements formed as part of a wider partnership involving Local TV, which Tribune bought outright in 2013); Evansville, Indiana de facto O&O WTVW (which joined The CW in January 2013) and ABC affiliate WEHT (a virtual duopoly formed through Nexstar Broadcasting Group's 2011 purchase of WEHT and trade of WTVW to partner group Mission Broadcasting); and the CW-CBS duopoly of KMAX-TV/KOVR in Sacramento (the former of which has produced a morning newscast, Good Day Sacramento, since it was a UPN owned-and-operated station, and – despite the two becoming a duopoly in 2005 – has remained separate from a more traditional morning show on KOVR pre-CBS This Morning, which produces KMAX's evening newscast). Another station that has newscast is KASW in Phoenix, Arizona during ABC's broadcast of Good Morning America.

The scheduling of news programming on The CW's affiliates often mirrors that of Fox stations, with morning newscasts (designed to compete with the national morning shows on ABC, CBS and NBC within the 7:00–9:00 a.m. timeslot; in duopolies, these are typically an extension of a sister station's morning newscast) and a prime time newscast within the 10:00–11:00 p.m. Eastern/Pacific (9:00–10:00 p.m. Central/Mountain) time slot. Rarely (but more common on the few major-market CW affiliates with in-house news departments), they may also include midday and/or early evening newscasts, including the network newscast slot of 6:30 p.m. ET/5:30 p.m. CT.

Sports programming 
In 2023, The CW agreed to a multi-year broadcast deal with LIV Golf, the upstart professional golf tour financed by Saudi Arabia's Public Investment Fund, marking the first-ever national sports broadcasting contract for the network (not including its previous relationships with WWE for sports entertainment programming as discussed elsewhere in this article). Weekday rounds will be available on The CW's streaming apps, while weekend rounds will air on the broadcast network. The network and main owner Nexstar were criticized by the National Press Club for participating in what it considers an attempt by the Saudi government to rehabilitate its image following the assassination of journalist Jamal Khashoggi. 

On February 14, 2023, the network said its LIV Golf coverage would be carried in 100% of U.S. media markets. However, as existing contracts only obligate CW affiliates to air prime time programming, some of them have declined to carry LIV coverage. In particular among the refraining stations are the eight CW stations owned by CBS News and Stations, ostensibly due to CBS Sports' longstanding partnership with the competing PGA Tour. In many of the affected markets, LIV coverage will air on a Nexstar-owned station or subchannel, or on another station not connected with The CW or Nexstar.

Outside of network programming, several CW affiliates have carried telecasts of basketball, football and in some cases, other collegiate sporting events (such as baseball or hockey) that are produced by syndicators, while a few carry games from local teams of major professional sports leagues such as Major League Baseball (the New York Mets on WPIX) and the NBA (the Los Angeles Clippers on KTLA).

Children's programming

On September 23, 2006, the Kids' WB children's programming block – which originated on The WB in September 1995 and continued to be produced by Warner Bros. Television – was carried over to The CW as part of its inaugural programming lineup; although the network on which it originated ceased operations the week before, the "Kids' WB" branding was retained for the block. On October 2, 2007, through a joint decision between corporate parents Warner Bros. Television and CBS Corporation, The CW announced that it would discontinue the Kids' WB block due to competition from cable channels aimed at the demographic such as Cartoon Network (which carried many series shared with the block and vice versa), Nickelodeon and Disney Channel, and would sell the programming rights to the network's Saturday morning block to 4Kids Entertainment (which at the time of the announcement, had produced a competing children's programming block, 4Kids TV, for Fox). Kids' WB ended its run on May 17, 2008 (though some CW affiliates that delayed the block to Sundays, such as Atlanta affiliate WUPA, aired the block for the last time on May 18).

The following week on May 24, 4Kids took over responsibility for The CW's Saturday morning children's lineup, with the debut of a new block called The CW4Kids. The block's lineup initially consisted mostly of programs carried over from Kids' WB, before eventually adding 4Kids-produced shows such as Chaotic as well as new seasons of Yu-Gi-Oh! and Teenage Mutant Ninja Turtles. The block was rebranded into Toonzai on August 14, 2010 (though The CW4Kids name was retained as a sub-brand to fulfill branding obligations that the network had to comply with per 4Kids Entertainment's contract to lease The CW's Saturday morning timeslots); Toonzai ended its run on August 18, 2012.

On July 3, 2012, Saban Brands and Kidsco Media Ventures, affiliates of Saban Capital Group, entered into an agreement to program the five-hour Saturday morning time slot with a new action-adventure and comedy programming block for The CW. TheCW4Kids/Toonzai was replaced by Vortexx on August 25, 2012, featuring programs such as Power Rangers Lost Galaxy and WWE Saturday Morning Slam, the latter of which marked the return of WWE programming to the network since WWE Smackdown moved to MyNetworkTV in 2008.

On June 5, 2014, The CW announced an agreement with Litton Entertainment to program a block of live-action series designed to comply with the FCC's educational programming guidelines. Vortexx (which was the last remaining non-educational children's block on the major U.S. broadcast networks) was replaced by One Magnificent Morning on October 4, 2014. The block features a mix of wildlife and lifestyle-themed programs, similar in vein to those featured on the Litton-produced blocks aired by ABC and CW sister network CBS (one of its initial programs, Expedition Wild, was moved over to "One Magnificent Morning" from the ABC block; while one of the CW block's early entries, Rock the Park, moved to "Litton's Weekend Adventure" after one season). On January 7, 2016, The CW and Litton announced a five-year renewal for the block, extending it through the 2020–21 broadcast season. Starting with the 2017–18 broadcast season, the block's running time was reduced to three hours and began airing from 8:00am to 11:00am. The CW returned the two hours of reclaimed time to the affiliates.

Stations

The CW has 37 affiliated stations owned-and-operated by its' majority owner Nexstar Media Group, eight affiliated stations owned by Paramount Global, and current and pending affiliation agreements with 220 additional television stations encompassing 50 states, the District of Columbia and three U.S. possessions. Counting only conventional CW affiliates and over-the-air affiliates of The CW Plus, the network has an estimated combined national reach of 100% of all households in the United States (or 330,866,316 Americans with at least one television set); this makes The CW the largest U.S. broadcast network by population reach percentage. As of January 2023, three U.S. states (Delaware, New Hampshire, and New Jersey) and three U.S. territories (American Samoa, Puerto Rico and the United States Virgin Islands) do not have their own locally-licensed CW affiliates, largely because those areas are either located within the broadcast ranges of stations in nearby states or served by out-of-market stations via cable or satellite. Delaware is served by Philadelphia's WPSG and Salisbury, Maryland affiliate WMDT-DT2, while New Hampshire is served by four CW stations based in three neighboring states (including Boston affiliate WLVI). New Jersey is served by WPSG and New York City affiliate WPIX.

As a newer broadcast network, The CW maintains affiliations with low-power stations (broadcasting either in analog or digital) in a few markets, such as Reno, Nevada (KRNS-CD) and Boise, Idaho (KYUU-LD). In some markets, including both of those mentioned, these stations also maintain digital simulcasts on a subchannel of a co-owned/co-managed full-power television station. The CW also maintains a sizeable number of subchannel-only affiliations, the majority of which are with stations in cities located outside of the 50 largest Nielsen-designated markets and receive the network's programming via The CW Plus; the largest subchannel-only CW affiliate by market size, as of May 31, 2017, is KFMB-TV DT2 in San Diego, California.

Nexstar Media Group is the largest operator of CW stations by numerical total, owning or providing services to 37 CW-affiliated stations, and also is the largest in terms of overall market reach, owning or providing services to CW stations (including its largest affiliates in New York and Los Angeles), covering 32% of the U.S.

Overview
On the day of the network launch announcement, The CW immediately announced it had reached ten-year affiliation agreements with Tribune Broadcasting and CBS Television Stations. Tribune originally committed 16 stations that were previously affiliated with The WB (including its flagship broadcast stations WGN-TV in Chicago, KTLA in Los Angeles and WPIX in New York City; another committed station, KSWB-TV in San Diego, joined Fox in August 2008, and two others, WLVI-TV in Boston and WCWN in Albany, New York were respectively sold by Tribune to Sunbeam Television and Freedom Communications shortly after the network launched), while CBS committed 11 of its UPN stations (including WKBD in Detroit, WPSG in Philadelphia, KBHK-TV (now KBCW) in San Francisco and WUPA in Atlanta). These stations combined to reach 48% of all television households in the United States. Both companies also owned several UPN and WB-affiliated stations that did not join The CW in overlapping markets (such as Seattle, Philadelphia and Dallas). As part of its affiliation agreement with the network, the Tribune Company agreed to divest its ownership interest in The WB (a move it made partly to avoid shouldering shutdown costs for The WB) and did not acquire an equity stake in The CW.

The network stated that it would eventually reach 95% of all U.S. television households. In markets where separate affiliates of both UPN and The WB operated, only one station became a CW affiliate. Executives were on record as preferring the "strongest" stations among The WB and UPN's existing affiliates. As one example, the new network's first affiliate outside the core group of Tribune and CBS-owned stations, WJZY in Charlotte (which was later acquired by Fox Television Stations and converted into a Fox O&O in July 2013), was tied with Atlanta O&O WUPA as UPN's fifth highest-rated station. In most cases, it was obvious where the new network would affiliate; there were only a few markets (such as Philadelphia, Miami–Fort Lauderdale, Boston, Charlotte, and Atlanta) where the WB and UPN affiliates were both relatively strong in terms of local overall viewership. For example, one of the earliest affiliates to be announced outside the core group, WKCF in Orlando, Florida, had not only been The WB's highest-rated affiliate for the virtual entirety of that network's run, but had also been the fourth highest-rated television station in Central Florida.

Nearly all of The CW's affiliates were formerly affiliated with UPN or The WB, with very few having been independent stations or affiliates of other networks prior to joining the network; a notable exception was Las Vegas affiliate KVCW, which had been a fairly successful independent before joining The CW. Although it was generally understood that The CW was a merger of UPN and The WB, the new network's creation was not structured as a merger in the legal sense. Rather, it was one new network launching at the same time that two others shut down, although it did assume certain programming content, operations, and management from its predecessors. As such, The CW was not obligated by existing affiliations with The WB and UPN; it had to negotiate from scratch with individual stations. As a result, in several markets, the CW affiliation is on a local station different from either the former WB and UPN stations (for example, the CW affiliation in Las Vegas ended up on KVCW, instead of former WB affiliate KVMY or now-defunct former UPN affiliate KTUD-CA). The network has also affiliated with some digital subchannels, usually those launched by a local Big Four affiliate as a new service, in several other markets – especially if fewer than six commercial television stations existed at the time of affiliation, requiring The CW to carry its programming on a subchannel by default (for example, The CW opted to affiliate with a subchannel of WKRC-TV in Cincinnati – which has only five commercial full-power stations – instead of former WB affiliate WSTR-TV, which instead became an affiliate of MyNetworkTV).

Because of the availability of "instant duopoly" digital subchannels that will likely be easily available on cable and satellite, and the overall lack of a need to settle for a secondary affiliation with shows aired in problematic timeslots that would subject the timeshifted programs to lower average viewership in certain markets, both The CW and MyNetworkTV launched with far greater national coverage than that enjoyed by UPN and The WB when they both launched in January 1995. UPN, for several years, had affiliation gaps in the top 30 markets, and by 2005 managed to cover only 86% of the country. This resulted in secondary affiliations with other networks and the resulting diluted ratings when programs were shown out of their intended timeslots, or the lack of the program airing at all (a problem experienced by many fans of the Star Trek franchise with Voyager and Enterprise).

Launch repercussions

The announcement of The CW caused the largest single shakeup in U.S. broadcast television since the affiliation alliance between Fox and New World Communications in 1994 (as well as a separate alliance with Burnham Broadcasting that began a year later) and the subsequent launches of UPN and The WB the following year. While The CW's debut affected more markets, it likely did not cause the same degree of viewer confusion, as no affiliates of the four major networks dropped those affiliations to join The CW (some "Big Four" affiliations did change at this time, but for unrelated reasons). The WB and UPN were the first major television networks to shut down since the collapse of the DuMont Television Network in August 1955, although other small broadcast television networks have also ceased operations over the years.

It became clear that Fox Television Stations, which purchased several UPN-affiliated stations from that network's former co-owner Chris-Craft Industries in 2002, would be affected. Its UPN affiliates in five major markets (New York City, Los Angeles, Chicago, Washington, D.C. and Houston) did not receive affiliations with The CW, due to the agreement with Tribune, and Fox made it clear it would not even seek carriage of the network for its UPN stations in four other markets. All network logos and references were quickly removed from Fox's UPN stations. Shortly thereafter, Fox parent News Corporation (now Fox Corporation) announced that it would launch MyNetworkTV, a programming service meant to fill the two nightly prime time hours that UPN would vacate on the network's Fox-owned affiliates after The CW launched. Fox also offered the service to stations owned by other broadcasting groups.

In markets where The WB and UPN were carried on separate stations, one of the two local outlets was left out in the merger; most of the stations that did not join The CW had signed affiliation agreements with MyNetworkTV instead, while others elected to become independent stations. Some stations (mainly digital subchannels, some cable channels that were formerly part of The WB 100+ Station Group, and struggling low-power stations) which did not affiliate with either network opted instead to shut down permanently.

Affiliate distribution
Like its predecessors UPN and by technicality, The WB (as none of Tribune Broadcasting's WB stations were considered to be O&Os since Time Warner held majority ownership of that network), The CW formerly does not have owned-and-operated stations in any of the three largest U.S. television markets – New York City, Los Angeles and Chicago. The network's de facto owned-and-operated flagship stations were Paramount-owned WPSG in Philadelphia and KBCW in San Francisco, both of which also became UPN's largest O&O after Chris-Craft Industries (which sold most of its UPN stations, including its affiliates in New York City and Los Angeles, to Fox Television Stations in 2001) had its ownership stake in that network acquired by Viacom in March 2000 (neither UPN nor the DuMont Television Network had an O&O in Chicago at all; a similar situation arose with DuMont's O&O in Los Angeles, present-day CW O&O KTLA – which had disaffiliated from the network in 1948 shortly after the FCC ruled that it and WDTV in Pittsburgh (now KDKA-TV, a CW corporate cousin through Paramount), to be O&Os through their then-owner Paramount Pictures' voting stock interest in DuMont).

Unlike with The WB and UPN (the latter network's founding owners, Chris-Craft and Viacom, both had their own station groups that formed UPN's core stations at its launch), only one of The CW's former co-owners – Paramount Global – maintained ownership of the network's owned-and-operated stations (since the summer 2017 sale of WPCH-TV/Atlanta, Warner Bros. Discovery holds no over-the-air assets whatsoever). KTLA was retained by Nexstar after the Tribune acquisition, while WPIX was sold to the E. W. Scripps Company, who would sell the station in 2020 to Mission Broadcasting, with Nexstar operating the station under an LMA. Weigel Broadcasting-owned WCIU became a CW affiliate in 2019, picking up from Fox Television Stations-owned WPWR, who had gained the affiliation from then Tribune-owned WGN in 2016. With Nexstar Media Group taking control of The CW in October 2022, all of Nexstar's CW affiliates became O&Os, with WPIX and KTLA replacing WPSG and KBCW as the network's flagships. WCIU remains the largest CW affiliate.

Digital multicasting and cable television
Unlike the other major networks, The CW distributes its programming in small and certain mid-sized markets throughout the United States (generally those ranked among the bottom 110 Nielsen media markets) through The CW Plus, a separate national feed and programming service that is carried on a mixture of full-power and low-power stations in some markets, and cable-only outlets and digital subchannel affiliations on major network stations in markets that do not have enough commercial stations to support a standalone CW affiliate (several of The CW Plus's digital subchannel outlets originally operated as cable-only affiliates at the network's launch). The programming service offers its own master schedule of syndicated and brokered programming acquired by the network (including some feature films and infomercials) during non-network programming hours, although some CW Plus affiliates may also run local newscasts produced by a major network affiliate.

CW predecessor The WB previously had two cable-only affiliate outlets: WGN America, the national superstation feed of WGN-TV at the time, from January 1995 to October 1999 and network-operated The WB 100+ Station Group (the direct predecessor to The CW Plus), which was formed in September 1998 and had several of its cable-only outlets join The CW Plus at the CW network's launch. Not all of the network's cable-only affiliates were CW Plus outlets, WT05 in Toledo, Ohio offered its own schedule of syndicated programs during non-network hours that was programmed by its then-owner Block Communications, which also operates that market's major cable provider Buckeye CableSystem (WT05 now exists as "CW13," having been converted into a digital subchannel of Gray Television-owned ABC affiliate WTVG in October 2014). Though The CW is the only network with a station group that includes cable-only outlets, it is actually one of only three networks that have had cable-only stations within its affiliate body (ABC formerly had a cable-only affiliate in Winchester, Virginia-based TV3 Winchester until Gray shut the channel down in December 2013).

Station standardization
When The CW launched in September 2006, the network began branding most of its affiliates and O&Os using a combination of "CW" or "The CW", and at the affiliate's choice, either the station's channel number (for example, Nashville affiliate WNAB is branded as "CW58" and Seattle affiliate KSTW brands as "CW11") or the name of the city or region it serves. Examples of the latter include Philadelphia affiliate WPSG (known as "The CW Philly 57" as an homage to its prior branding as an independent station), WLVI (known at launch as "Boston's CW", though it rebranded to "CW56" after being sold to Sunbeam Television), WUPA (known as "CW Atlanta" at launch, but is now known as "CW69"), Waco, Texas subchannel affiliate KWTX-DT2 (known as "CW Texas") and KVCW (branded as "CW Las Vegas"). Some stations also use the call sign either within the station logo, in on-air identification or both; examples include WNLO/Buffalo, New York and WWHO/Columbus, Ohio (WBNX/Cleveland formerly also did so until its affiliation was terminated in July 2018).

In Omaha, Nebraska, KXVO used the dual brandings of "CW15" and "Omaha's CW" during its time as a CW affiliate. In Honolulu, Hawaii, KHON-DT2 was originally branded as "Hawaii's CW 93" (the "93" refers to the subchannel's cable channel position on Oceanic Time Warner Cable), before it was shortened to "Hawaii's CW" in September 2014. The branding once used by WKRC-DT2/Cincinnati, Ohio was "CinCW", a portmanteau with the common nickname for the city, "Cincy" (it now brands as "The CW Cincinnati"). With the exceptions of WXCW/Fort Myers and (to a somewhat lesser extent) XETV/San Diego, all CW affiliates not owned by Nexstar usually brand themselves using a version of the network logo. Mobile, Alabama CW affiliate WBPG, then known as "The Gulf Coast's CW" changed its call letters to WFNA in December 2009 and used a similar approach around their new call letters, before becoming known as "CW 55" in September 2012 and adopting a style reflective of The CW's branding techniques once again. For one year in 2016, WVTV in Milwaukee held a dual branding of "Super 18, The CW", bringing back its pre-WB branding; it eventually returned to "CW 18" in the fall of 2017 due to its owner, Sinclair Broadcast Group, wanting to hub the same branding and network/programming promotions across all their CW affiliates. WISH-TV in Indianapolis, as it had during its CBS affiliation, continues to brand solely with its channel number and calls as "WISH-TV 8", with "The CW" appended where appropriate, usually only in print and radio advertising.

Affiliate issues

Problems with Time Warner Cable
Some Time Warner Cable subscribers around the country were unable to watch CW programming when the network debuted, as stations in several markets were not able to reach carriage deals with the provider to distribute the local affiliates. In markets like Charleston, South Carolina; El Paso, Texas; Honolulu, Hawaii; Palm Springs, California; Beaumont; Waco and Corpus Christi, Texas, where The CW is broadcast on a digital subchannel of one of the market's major network affiliates, there were unsuccessful attempts in getting Time Warner Cable to carry the subchannel affiliates (CW co-parent Time Warner had owned Time Warner Cable until it spun off the provider into a separate company in 2009).

Some affiliates eventually signed carriage deals with Time Warner Cable, but not all of the CW affiliates received carriage on the provider's basic cable tiers (for example, Syracuse, New York affiliate WSTQ-LP could only be viewed on digital cable channel 266 in the Ithaca market). The largest market without a known affiliate is the Johnstown–Altoona market, whose closest CW station is CBS O&O WPCW/Pittsburgh, which is carried on TWC's Johnstown and Altoona area systems; WPCW was originally targeted to serve that area before it refocused its programming toward the Pittsburgh market in the late 1990s.

On February 2, 2007, Beaumont, Texas CBS station KFDM made its CW-affiliated subchannel available to Time Warner Cable customers in the market on channel 10. On April 20, 2007, ABC affiliate KVIA-TV in El Paso, Texas began broadcasting its CW-affiliated subchannel on Time Warner Cable channel 13. On April 21, 2007, KCWQ-LP made its broadcast debut on channel 5 on Time Warner Cable in the Palm Springs area.

Pappas Telecasting bankruptcy
One of the network's major affiliate groups, Pappas Telecasting Companies, filed for Chapter 11 bankruptcy for thirteen of its television stations on May 10, 2008. Within the petition, Pappas specifically cited the network's low ratings and lackluster performance as one of many complications that had forced it to make the filing. Several of the stations have since been sold either in business transactions with representatives involved in Pappas's bankruptcy proceedings or via station auction processes as the company winds down operations.

Although Pappas had originally stated that none of its stations would be affected at all by the closing, two stations owned by the company that were formerly affiliated with The CW have ceased operations. On May 29, 2008, Yakima, Washington affiliate KCWK (which served the south-central portion of that state) shut down and the station's offices were closed, leaving that area without locally based CW programming and forcing pay television providers to carry Los Angeles affiliate KTLA in order to provide the network's programming to their subscribers. The situation was resolved in April 2009, when Fisher Communications announced that its CBS affiliates in the area, KIMA-TV and satellite station KEPR-TV, would carry the network through DTT subchannel affiliations.

Subsequently, WLGA in Columbus, Georgia lost its CW affiliation in April 2009 to a subchannel of NBC affiliate WLTZ because of the network's concerns about Pappas' financial state; WLGA ultimately ceased operations in June 2010 as it was unable to compete in the market as an independent station; it later resumed operations in August 2012, as an affiliate of WeatherNation TV (it is now a Cozi TV affiliate).

Marianas Media bankruptcy
Marianas Media signed on KTKB-LD in Hagåtña, Guam as a CW affiliate on April 20, 2009, becoming the U.S. territory's fifth commercial television outlet. However, competition from other stations in the island combined with financial problems at the Marianas, which was running the station under a local marketing agreement with the troubled KM Communications Inc., forced the station off the air on March 31, 2011. The station resumed operations the following year.

Tribune's relations with The CW
While Tribune Media had solid affiliation deals with The CW on several of its stations, it also maintained a strong affiliation alliance with Fox. But with new management and ownership taking over Tribune in 2008, it was apparent that the company would switch one of its CW-affiliated stations to Fox (at least those in markets without a Fox owned-and-operated station or a former O&O that was acquired by Local TV, which Tribune later acquired in 2013), adding to more questions surrounding The CW's future. In a March 2008 seminar by Tribune's then-chairman and CEO Sam Zell, it was revealed that the company's San Diego outlet KSWB-TV would switch its affiliation from The CW to Fox that August, with KSWB assuming the Fox affiliation from XETV-TV, which had been a Fox charter affiliate since that network's October 1986 inception. XETV (which is licensed to Tijuana, Baja California, Mexico under the ownership of Grupo Televisa but whose U.S. operations are programmed by Bay City Television) was not informed of Zell's deal until it was made public.

After the news broke, XETV planned on suing to prevent the switch because it would violate an affiliation contract that XETV had with Fox that was not set to expire until 2010. However, on July 2, 2008, XETV announced that it would join The CW on August 1 (the same day that KSWB became a Fox affiliate) and rebrand as "San Diego 6". Though twelve of Tribune's thirteen other CW-affiliated stations have remained with the network, all of them began to de-emphasize the network from their branding (e.g., "CW 11") in favor of one with a stronger local identity. On-air branding that excised the CW name began being implemented by the stations in July 2008, either on-air (in the case of KWGN-TV) or through their websites (as part of a redesign for all of the Tribune stations' websites). Some of these stations eventually began reincorporating the CW branding starting in 2011, such as KDAF/Dallas, KIAH/Houston and KRCW-TV/Portland, Oregon.

Tribune Company president and CEO Peter Liguori said in a May 2014 discussion at the MoffettNathanson Media & Communications Summit that he was "not pleased with where the CW is [in regards to its ratings performance]," stating that the network "should not program to [young] people who don't watch [conventional] television." Liguori also stated that he would consider collaborating with the network in regards to improving its programming slate, possibly by incorporating programs from the company's Tribune Studios unit (a production division which launched shortly after Liguori was appointed president of Tribune in November 2013) onto the network, as well as having Tribune play a larger role in The CW's management.

Speaking at Goldman Sachs' 23rd Annual Communacopia Conference in September 2014, Les Moonves acknowledged that Tribune had been looking for more input in how the network is programmed and noted that Liguori is a former programmer (having previously served in executive roles at Fox, FX and Discovery Communications), saying that "[Liguori] would like to participate. He has some good ideas. He's part of our team. Will there be some change in how the CW is structured going forward? I don't know." Moonves went on to reiterate that Tribune is "a very important part of [CBS'] future" (considering that Tribune had recently acquired the CBS affiliation for its Indianapolis station and then-CW affiliate WTTV, following disagreements between CBS and longtime affiliate WISH-TV, which would eventually take over the CW affiliation in January 2015, over reverse compensation demands by the network).

In an October 2014 interview with Broadcasting & Cable, Liguori appeared to reverse course on his previous statements and spoke of Tribune's support of the network. Liguori said in a statement, "We are very encouraged by the recent uptick in The CW['s] ratings and the positive critical response to the new primetime lineup. In particular, [CW CEO Mark Pedowitz] has put in place a programming strategy that will help the network appeal to a wider, more inclusive audience, which is important for our stations across the country. We were glad to support the launch of the new shows through editorial and promotional initiatives, and we look forward to more continued collaboration to build upon this momentum."

In January 2016, The CW and Tribune began negotiations on a new affiliation deal, as the original 10-year agreement signed at the network's inception was approaching its end. Complicating matters was the desire by The CW's then-parent companies, CBS and Warner Bros., to stream the network's programming as a standalone pay OTT service. The impasse in negotiations resulted in a months-long standoff between the two groups.

On May 23, 2016, The CW and Tribune announced they had come to a new affiliation agreement. As part of the deal, Tribune's Chicago flagship WGN-TV would leave the network and revert to being an independent station after nearly 21 years of being affiliated with The CW and its predecessor network, The WB. A major factor in this decision was WGN-TV's large use of local sports programming at the time, which led to many pre-emptions of the CW while WGN-TV had to move as many as 30 games a year to another local station in Chicago. The CW affiliation moved to WPWR-TV, a Fox Television Stations-owned MyNetworkTV station. On September 19, 2019, Tribune Media was acquired by Nexstar Media Group.

Roberts Broadcasting bankruptcy
Roberts Broadcasting filed for Chapter 11 bankruptcy protection on October 7, 2011; the company cited the loss of the UPN affiliations on its stations in St. Louis (WRBU), Columbia, South Carolina (WZRB) and Jackson, Mississippi (WRBJ-TV) when that network shut down in favor of The CW in 2006, as much of UPN's programming consisted of minority-targeted programs that Roberts felt were compatible with their stations' target audiences (though the stations have since recovered from this setback; additionally, its station in Evansville, Indiana, WAZE-TV, had instead affiliated with The WB prior to 2006, as it was owned by South Central Communications until February 2007). The company had also been hit with lawsuits from Warner Bros. Television, Twentieth Television and CBS Television Distribution over its failure to pay fees for syndicated programming; Roberts eventually settled with Twentieth but lost the Warner Bros. and CBS cases.

On March 24, 2011, the Federal Communications Commission (FCC) canceled WAZE's license for Roberts' failure to construct its digital transmitter facilities. However, the station continued to broadcast via its three-station analog translator network.

On February 20, 2012, Roberts Broadcasting announced that it was exploring the possibility of selling one or all four of its television stations in order to raise enough cash to pay off its creditors. On October 22, 2012, Roberts announced that it had sold WRBJ to the Trinity Broadcasting Network; the deal was approved by a bankruptcy court on January 17, 2013, with TBN officially taking over operational control of WRBJ five months later on May 24 (The CW would return to the Jackson market on the second digital subchannel of CBS affiliate WJTV in September 2013). On January 3, 2013, the repeater network of WAZE ceased operations; later that month on January 28, independent station WTVW hurriedly joined The CW, in order to maintain the network in the Evansville area.

On December 2, 2013, Roberts filed to sell WZRB to Radiant Light Ministries, a subsidiary of Tri-State Christian Television, for $2 million. On December 4, Roberts also filed to sell WRBU to TCT for $5.5 million. However, on December 11, the United States bankruptcy court gave initial approval for a plan by Roberts's creditors to instead transfer WRBU, WZRB and the WAZE repeaters to a trust with Ion Media Networks (a creditor in Roberts's chapter 11 bankruptcy proceedings) as its beneficiary, with Roberts' attorney subsequently stating that Ion would purchase the stations for $7.75 million. Roberts had earlier proposed an alternate plan that would have had only the WAZE repeaters be transferred to the trust, which would have allowed the sale of WRBU and WZRB to TCT. The CW affiliation in Columbia moved to WKTC (with MyNetworkTV, which the station had already been affiliated with, being relegated to a secondary affiliation) in March 2014, after temporarily remaining on WZRB after its conversion into an Ion Television O&O the previous month.

Related services

Video-on-demand services
The CW provides video on demand access for delayed viewing of full episodes of the network's programming through various means, including via its website at CWTV.com and its mobile apps for iOS and Android devices (with programs streamable over WiFi and cellular networks), a traditional VOD service – called The CW on Demand – that is available on most traditional cable and IPTV providers, and through content deals with Hulu, iTunes and Netflix.

In January 2007, The CW began streaming full-length episodes of several of its programs on the CWTV.com website. The most recent episodes of the network's shows are usually made available on The CW app and The CW on Demand the day after their original broadcast. Due to restrictions imposed through its deal with the streaming service, streaming of the most recent episode of any CW program on Hulu is restricted until eight days after their initial broadcast, in order to encourage live or same-week (via both DVR and cable on-demand) viewing, with day-after-air streaming on either service limited to subscribers of Hulu's subscription service. The CW previously imposed a three-day delay after an episode's original airdate before making its programs available on its website and through the Hulu subscription service (then known as Hulu Plus). However, changes implemented by the network on March 15, 2012, to reduce copyright infringement of its programming content through illegal streaming and downloading internet platforms resulted in that delay being reduced to eight hours after a program's original airing through both services. Like the video-on-demand television services provided by the other U.S. broadcast networks, The CW on Demand disables fast forwarding for content provided through the service.

In October 2011, the network entered into digital distribution deals with streaming services Netflix and Hulu. The four-year Netflix agreement allowed its customers to instantly watch more than 700 hours of previous seasons of The CW's current scripted series, while Hulu inked a five-year deal, giving the streaming site access to next-day content from four of the five major networks (except for CW sister network CBS). The Netflix deal was estimated to be worth $1 billion, providing a much needed lifeline to the money-losing CW network and solidified its future as a valuable asset for then-co-owners CBS and Warner Bros. The Netflix deal was renewed in 2016, updated to allow the streaming service to provide entire seasons of CW shows a week after their airing. The Hulu deal was discontinued at this time. In 2019, The CW and Netflix opted not to renew the deal. The respective studios of CW shows will instead sell to streaming services individually. Beginning in 2020, WarnerMedia streaming service HBO Max will be the exclusive streaming home for Warner Bros.-produced CW shows.

On October 24, 2012, The CW entered into its first video-on-demand distribution deal with a pay television provider through an agreement with Comcast that allows customers to watch the four most-recent episodes of the network's primetime shows on the cable provider's Xfinity On Demand service, along with next-day episode content. The CW On Demand, which is accessible to subscribers at no additional charge, debuted on Comcast Xfinity systems nationwide on October 25.

High-definition feed
The CW's master feed is transmitted in 1080i high definition, with all transmission of the network's programming moving to the format in June 2012. All of the network's prime time programming has been presented in HD since March 2012 (when America's Next Top Model became the final CW program to convert to the format), with the exception of certain specials produced prior to that point (such as Grandma Got Run Over by a Reindeer, a holiday special carried over to the network from The WB) and select movie presentations. The network's Saturday morning E/I block, One Magnificent Morning, is also broadcast in HD, with the final SD program, the two-season daytime talk show The Robert Irvine Show converting to the format for its second to last season in September 2017 (and in turn ending American broadcast network television's standard definition age).

The network is available in HD on most of its full-power affiliates, while availability of high definition content on subchannel-only or cable-exclusive affiliates varies by market; in some of these cases, the over-the-air signal is available only in standard definition (a 16:9 widescreen feed transmitted in 480i SD is presented on some over-the-air affiliates to meet minimum requirements for presentation), with the station offering an exclusive high definition feed to pay television providers. Some affiliates transmit CW programming in 720p HD due to technical considerations if the network is carried on a digital terrestrial subchannel of a station affiliated with another major network or if a primary feed CW affiliate carries more than one subchannel. Since June 2012, The CW Plus feed is also transmitted in HD, and the network has asked those affiliates to carry it in high definition wherever possible. With CBS beginning to use 16:9 framing for all of their graphics on September 24, 2018, The CW was the last major network that continued to use 4:3 framing for all graphics, before switching to 16:9 framing for all of their graphics in August 2020.

All the HD programming are broadcast in 5.1 surround sound.

CW Seed
CW Seed (originally called CWD or the CW Digital Studio) is a production arm that provided original content created exclusively for digital platforms focused in the areas of animation, game shows, comedy, and digital personalities. Previously existing as a section on The CW's main website, CW Seed was spun-off to a separate domain in 2013 as a streaming platform. The free media app became available on several devices, including Roku and Amazon Fire TV.

Original web series produced by CW Seed includes Stupid Hype, I Ship It, How to Be a Vampire, JoJoHead, Prom Queen, Husbands, the Arrowverse series Vixen and Freedom Fighters: The Ray, and Constantine: City of Demons. In addition, CW Seed hosts various library programming from former co-owners CBS and Warner Bros. On January 8, 2020, CW Seed acquired U.S. streaming rights to 14 series from BBC Studios. In September 2020, the platform added over 300 hours of programming with additional seasons for existing shows, and new series such as 90210, Lost Girl, Nikita, and XIII: The Conspiracy. The CW Seed app and website were reabsorbed into The CW's in April 2022.

Footnotes

References

Further reading

External links

  (Site only accessible from within the United States)

The CW
Nexstar Media Group
CBS Television Network
Warner Bros. Discovery networks
Joint ventures
Television networks in the United States
Television channels and stations established in 2006
2022 mergers and acquisitions